William Robinson (born 20 February 1936) is a British boxer and fought as Bill Robinson. He competed in the men's light middleweight event at the 1964 Summer Olympics. He received a bye in the first round, before being defeated by Nojim Maiyegun of Nigeria in the next round, after the referee stopped the contest.

Robinson won the 1964 Amateur Boxing Association British light-middleweight title and 1965 British middleweight title, when boxing out of the Stock Exchange ABC.

References

External links
 

1936 births
Living people
British male boxers
Olympic boxers of Great Britain
Boxers at the 1964 Summer Olympics
Place of birth missing (living people)
Light-middleweight boxers